Christopher Noel Rawsthorne (24 December 1929 – 28 January 2019) was a British liturgical and concert organist and composer of music for his own instrument, as well as choral music.

Biography 
Rawsthorne was born in Birkenhead. At the age of eight he became a chorister at Liverpool Parish Church which started his interest in the pipe organ. Two years later, he became a chorister at Liverpool Cathedral (while also studying at Liverpool Institute High School) and started organ lessons under Caleb Jarvis at the nearby St George's Hall.

In six years time later pursued organ studies under Harold Dawber at the Royal Manchester College of Music, after receiving a coveted exhibition. In 1949, he later became the Assistant Organist of the cathedral, and also received Associateship of the Royal College of Organists (ARCO) and was later elected a fellow (FRCO) in 1953.

In 1958, he received an education grant to study in Italy with Fernando Germani and later in Paris with Marcel Dupré. He became Organist of Liverpool Cathedral in 1955, succeeding Harry Goss-Custard, and served in this capacity until 1980. While there, he composed many original choral works, such as the Festive Eucharist (1978) which is still sung regularly by churches across the Anglican Diocese of Liverpool. Until 1993, Rawsthorne was Senior Lecturer in Music at St Katharine's College, Liverpool (now Liverpool Hope University).

Rawsthorne received an honorary doctorate in music from the University of Liverpool and his work with the Royal Liverpool Philharmonic Orchestra included supervision of the refurbishment of the Rushworth and Dreaper organ in the Philharmonic Hall and he sustained substantial friendships, personal and professional, with successive Maestros of the Philharmonic. He mentored Ian Tracey (later a professor), who succeeded his position of Organist of Liverpool Cathedral in 1980.

He died in Liverpool in 2019, aged 89.

Music 
Rawsthorne's compositions and arrangements are found in many contemporary collections of organ music.

His Hornpipe Humoresque is an amusing set of variations on the familiar Sailor's Hornpipe, in the styles of Bach (Brandenburg Concerto No. 3, 1st movement), Vivaldi ("Spring," 1st movement, from The Four Seasons), Arne (Rule Britannia) and Widor ("Toccata" from Symphony for Organ No. 5). Arguably his most popular work is the Aria in F major.

To commemorate Rawsthorne's 83rd birthday, a CD of 23 of his works was recorded by Gordon Stewart; including many compositions never previously recorded.

References

External links
 Programme notes on the occasion of Noel Rawsthorne's 70th birthday from Simon Lindley's website

1929 births
2019 deaths
English classical organists
British male organists
Cathedral organists
21st-century organists
21st-century British male musicians
21st-century English musicians
20th-century organists
20th-century British male musicians
20th-century British musicians
20th-century English musicians
20th-century classical musicians
Male classical organists